The Kaiyi Kunlun (昆仑) is a mid-size crossover SUV produced by Chery under the Kaiyi or Cowin Auto brand.

Overview

The Kaiyi Kunlun was launched in February 2023 offering 5-seat and 7-seat (2+3+2) layouts. The interior of the Kunlun features a full LCD instrument panel and a floating 12.8-inch central control screen with Huawei media system. Basic driving assistance features include keyless entry, lane departure warning, autonomous parking, hill start assistance, and hill descent control. The higher trim level offers a level 2 driving assistance system.

Powertrain
The gasoline version of the Kaiyi Kunlun is available with a 1.6-litre turbo engine or a 2.0-litre turbo engine, both engine options are mated to a seven-speed DCT. The 1.6-litre turbo engine has a maximum power of 197 hp (147kW) and a peak torque of 290Nm. The 2.0-litre Turbo engine has a maximum power of 254 hp (187kW) and a peak torque of 390Nm with the fuel consumption of 8.3 liters per 100 kilometers. The PHEV version of the Kunlun is equipped with a 1.5-litre turbo engine and electric motors, with single-motor and dual-motor options available. The maximum power of the two variants are 204 hp (150kW) and 367 hp(270kW), supporting a pure electric cruising range of 120km and 180km respectively.

References

External links

Kaiyi Official website

Kunlun
Mid-size sport utility vehicles
Crossover sport utility vehicles
Cars introduced in 2023
Cars of China